Alice Standish Buell (1892–1960) was an American artist and printmaker. Her work is included in the collections of the Whitney Museum of American Art the Metropolitan Museum of Art, and the National Gallery of Art.

References

1892 births
1960 deaths
American printmakers
American women printmakers
Date of birth missing
Date of death missing
Place of birth missing
Place of death missing
20th-century American printmakers
20th-century American women artists